Aquapeziza is a genus of fungus under the family Pezizaceae. It categorizes species of fungi that live submerged in freshwater. This is a monotypic taxon with the single documented species being Aquapeziza globispora.

Discovery 
The genus of fungus was discovered on the 7th of February, 2010, in Yulu Stream, Yunnan Province, China.

References 

Pezizaceae
Pezizales genera